"Put a Little Love in Your Heart" is a song originally performed in 1969 by Jackie DeShannon, who composed it with her brother Randy Myers and Jimmy Holiday. In the U.S., it was DeShannon's highest-charting hit, reaching number 4 on the Hot 100 in August 1969 and number 2 on the Adult Contemporary chart. In late 1969, the song reached number 1 on South Africa's hit parade. The song rivalled the success of her signature song, "What the World Needs Now Is Love".

In 1988, Annie Lennox and Al Green released a cover version of "Put a Little Love in Your Heart" which reached number 9 on the US Billboard Hot 100.

Charts

Annie Lennox and Al Green version

In 1988, Annie Lennox and Al Green recorded a version that was released as the ending theme song to the 1988 film Scrooged. The song reached number 9 in the US on the Hot 100 in January 1989 and climbed all the way to number 2 on the US Adult Contemporary chart, as well as becoming a top 40 hit in several countries worldwide, including number 28 in the UK for the festive season of 1988–1989. Although credited to Lennox, the song was produced by her Eurythmics partner David A. Stewart.

The video was directed by Sophie Muller.

Personnel
Annie Lennox – vocals
Al Green – vocals

Charts

Weekly charts

Year-end charts

Other versions

Susan Raye, on her debut 1969 album, One Night Stand. It was released as a single and peaked at number 30 on the Billboard Hot Country Songs chart.
The Dave Clark Five, in 1969. Issued as a single in the UK, it spent four weeks in the top 75, reaching number 31, three positions below that attained by Annie Lennox and Al Green in 1988.
Andy Williams – Get Together with Andy Williams (1969)
Cilla Black – Sweet Inspiration (1970)
The Isley Brothers, on 1972's Brother, Brother, Brother album.
At the end of Richard Donner's film Scrooged (1988), Bill Murray breaks the fourth wall to lead a sing-along of the song.
Leonard Nimoy, on his 1974 album [[Leonard Nimoy discography#Outer Space/Inner Mind|Outer Space/Inner Mind]].
Bright Light Bright Light included a duet, performed with Nerina Pallot, on his 2017 EP Cinematography III''. (2017)
Circle Jerks included a hard-core punk version on their 1982 album, Wild in the Streets (Circle Jerks album)

References

External links
Put A Little Love In Your Heart lyrics at Dolly Parton On-Line

1968 songs
1968 singles
1988 singles
Songs written by Jackie DeShannon
Songs written by Jimmy Holiday
Jackie DeShannon songs
Annie Lennox songs
Al Green songs
Susan Raye songs
The Dave Clark Five songs
Andy Williams songs
Male–female vocal duets
Song recordings produced by Dave Stewart (musician and producer)
Imperial Records singles
A&M Records singles
Number-one singles in South Africa